Aliero is a town in northern Nigeria's Kebbi State.  Located in the southeast of Kebbi State , the name Aliero was originally from two prominent Fulani scholars Ali & Yero. The town is the headquarters of Aliero Local Government Area.

Economy
Most of the people in Aliero LGA are agrarian, with emphasis on vegetation, especially onion and paper. The town has the largest onion market in northwest Nigeria and is a major producer of onions in Nigeria. Aliero residents are known for bone setting across West and Central Africa. Aliero town is surrounded by mango trees.

See also
Adamu Aliero

Populated places in Kebbi State